William Lawrence Kocay is a Canadian professor at the department of computer science at St. Paul's College of the University of Manitoba and a graph theorist. He is known for his work in graph algorithms and the reconstruction conjecture and is affectionately referred to as "Wild Bill" by his students. Bill Kocay is a former managing editor (from Jan 1988 to May 1997) of Ars Combinatoria, a Canadian journal of combinatorial mathematics, is a founding fellow of the Institute of Combinatorics and its Applications.

His research interests include algorithms for graphs, the development of mathematical software, the graph reconstruction problem, the graph isomorphism problem, projective geometry, Hamiltonian cycles, planarity, graph embedding algorithms, graphs on surfaces, and combinatorial designs.

Publications
 Some new methods in reconstruction theory, W. L. Kocay – Combinatorial mathematics, IX (Brisbane, 1981), LNM
 Some NP-complete problems for hypergraph degree sequences, CJ Colbourn, WL Kocay, DR Stinson – Discrete Applied Mathematics, 1986 – portal.acm.org

Books and software package
 Graphs, algorithms, and optimization By William Kocay, Donald L. Kreher, Published 2004, CRC Press, 483 pages 
 Groups and graphs – A mainly Mac OS X software package for graphs, digraphs, combinatorial designs, projective configurations, polyhedra, graph embeddings in the torus and projective plane, and automorphism groups. It also constructs fractals.

See also
 List of University of Waterloo people

References

 William Lawrence Kocay's homepage
 

Year of birth missing (living people)
Living people
Graph theorists
University of Waterloo alumni
Academic staff of the University of Manitoba
American computer scientists
Academic journal editors